The 1895 New South Wales colonial election was for 125 electoral districts, with each district returning one member.
The election was conducted on the basis of a simple majority or first-past-the-post voting system. In this election, in 23 electorates the winning candidate received less than 50% of the votes, while 8 were uncontested. The average number of enrolled voters per electorate was 2,025, ranging from Lismore (1,366) to Marrickville (2,863).

Election results

Albury

Alma

Annandale

Argyle

Armidale

Ashburnham

Ashfield

Ballina

Balmain North

Balmain South

The Barwon

Bathurst

Bega

Bingara

Boorowa

Botany

Bourke

Bowral

Braidwood

Broken Hill

Burwood

Camden

Canterbury

The Clarence

Cobar

Condoublin

Coonamble

Cowra

Darlington

Deniliquin

Dubbo

Durham

East Maitland

Eden-Bombala

Glebe

Glen Innes

Gloucester

Goulburn

Grafton

Granville

Grenfell

Gundagai

Gunnedah

Hartley

The Hastings and The Macleay

The Hawkesbury

Hay

The Hume

Illawarra

Inverell

Kahibah

Alfred Edden left Labor in 1891 over the question of the solidarity pledge and was elected as an Independent Labour member in 1894 and rejoined Labour before this election.

Kiama

The Lachlan

Leichhardt

Lismore

Macquarie

Manaro

The Manning

Marrickville

Molong

Moree

Moruya

Mudgee

The Murray

The Murrumbidgee

Narrabri

The Nepean

Newcastle East

Newcastle West

Newtown-Camperdown

Newtown-Erskine

Newtown-St Peters

Northumberland

Orange

Paddington

Parramatta

Petersham

Queanbeyan

Quirindi

Raleigh

Randwick

Redfern

The Richmond

Robertson

Ryde

Rylstone

St George

St Leonards

Sherbrooke

The Shoalhaven

Singleton

Sturt

Sydney-Belmore

Sydney-Bligh

Sydney-Cook

Sydney-Denison

Sydney-Fitzroy

Sydney-Flinders

Sydney-Gipps

Sydney-King

Sydney-Lang

Sydney-Phillip

Sydney-Pyrmont

Tamworth

Tenterfield

Tumut

As this was a tied result, the returning officer had a casting vote and chose Travers Jones.  The Elections and Qualifications Committee conducted a recount with the results as follows.

The Tweed

Uralla-Walcha

Wagga Wagga

Wallsend

Waratah

Warringah

Waterloo

Waverley

Wellington

Wentworth

West Macquarie

West Maitland

Wickham

Wilcannia

Willoughby

Woollahra

Woronora

Yass

Young

See also 

 Candidates of the 1895 New South Wales colonial election
 Members of the New South Wales Legislative Assembly, 1895–1898

References 

1895